This list of missing landmarks in Spain includes remarkable buildings, castles, royal palaces, medieval towers, city gates and other noteworthy structures that no longer exist in Spain, or have been partially destroyed. It does not include walls of cities. City gates are included.

There are hundreds of ruins of destroyed landmarks all over Spain, although there are many famous structures standing.
Many of these destroyed monuments could be important examples of cultures passed, of that cities today.

The following is an incomplete list.

List (by city and then alphabetical order)

Buildings

Forts and batteries

Fountains and memorials

See also 
 Project of Filippo Juvarra for the Royal Palace of Madrid
 Spanish confiscation
 List of submerged places in Spain

References

Landmarks
Landmarks
 Landmarks
Landmarks
 Landmarks
Spain, missing